Mahaica-Berbice (Region 5) is a region of Guyana, bordering the Atlantic Ocean to the north, the region of East Berbice-Corentyne to the east, the region of Upper Demerara-Berbice to the south and the region of Demerara-Mahaica to the west.

It contains the villages of Rosignol, Fort Wellington, and Mahaicony.

The Mahaica River runs along the region's western border.  The Berbice River is the eastern border.  The Mahaicony and Abary Rivers run south to north.

Population
The Government of Guyana has administered three official censuses since the 1980 administrative reforms, in 1980, 1991 and 2002.  In 2012, the population of Mahaica-Berbice was recorded at 49,723 people. Official census records for the population of the Mahaica-Berbice region are as follows:

2012 : 49,723
2002 : 52,400
1991 : 51,280
1980 : 53,898

Communities
(including name variants):

Abary
Bel Air
Belladrum
Blairmont (Blairmont Place)
Burma
Bush Lot
Catherinas Lust
Cotton Tree
Esau and Jacob
Fort Wellington
Gordon Table
Governor Light
Hopetown
Ithaca
Jacoba
Lichfield (Forty-two)
Mahaicony (Mahaicony Village)
Mora Point
Moraikobai (Moraikobe)
Mortice
Number 4 (Edderton Village)
Number 7 (Blairmont)
Number 8 (Inverness)
Number 9 (Expectation)
Number 11 (Woodley Park)
Number 40 Village (Seafield, Forty)
Number 41 (Forty-one Village)
Perth (Perth Village)
Pine Ground
Rising Sun
Rosignol
Saint Francis Mission
Saint John
Tempe
Washington
Weldaad

See also

References

 
Regions of Guyana